Zygovisti (also Ζιγοβίστι Zigovisti) is a village in the municipal unit Dimitsana, western Arcadia, Greece. It is located in the mountains east of the river Lousios, 3 km southeast of Dimitsana and 4 km north of Stemnitsa. At 1160 m elevation, it is one of the highest villages in Greece. There is a large marble book in the village square, commemorating the Greek War of Independence. It is considered a traditional settlement.

Historical population

See also
List of settlements in Arcadia
List of traditional settlements of Greece

References

Populated places in Arcadia, Peloponnese